Les Pontins (el. 1110 m.) is a high mountain pass in the Jura Mountains in the canton of Berne in Switzerland.

See also
 List of highest paved roads in Europe
 List of mountain passes
List of the highest Swiss passes

Pontins
Pontins
Mountain passes of the canton of Bern